A Galago, also known as a bushbaby, is a small nocturnal primate.

Galago may also refer to:

 Lemur Project, an open-source project containing the Galago search engine
 Galago (magazine), a Swedish comics and illustrations magazine

See also
 Galgo, a traditional Korean drum
 Galgo Español, a breed of dog